Mataifale Aigafaimeaso'o "Matt" Toeaina (born October 9, 1984) is a former American football defensive tackle who played in the National Football League. He was drafted by the Cincinnati Bengals in the sixth round of the 2007 NFL Draft, and later played for the Chicago Bears. He is from Pago Pago, American Samoa and played college football at Oregon.

Professional career

Cincinnati Bengals
Toeaina was drafted by the Cincinnati Bengals in the sixth round of the 2007 NFL Draft. In a 2007 preseason game against the Detroit Lions, he returned an interception for 81 yards and a touchdown—an improbable achievement for a 311-pound defensive tackle. Toeaina, however did not make the Bengals final roster, and was signed to their practice squad.

Chicago Bears
Toeaina was signed by the Chicago Bears to a three-year contract on December 12, 2007.

He saw his first regular season action when the Chicago Bears signed him late in the season.  Toeaina registered his first NFL sack against the Philadelphia Eagles on November 28, 2010.

Toeaina signed a 3-year contract extension with the Chicago Bears on December 27, 2010.

On December 17, 2012, Toeaina was placed on injured reserve.

On March 13, 2013, the Bears announced that they will release Toeaina, and was officially released on April 2. Toeaina ended his tenure in Chicago with 24 starts, recording 66 tackles, two sacks, three passes broken up, and one fumble recovery.

References

External links

1982 births
Living people
Players of American football from San Francisco
American football defensive tackles
Oregon Ducks football players
Cincinnati Bengals players
Chicago Bears players
Players of American football from American Samoa
American sportspeople of Samoan descent